Metrocentro is a Salvadoran shopping mall chain in Central America.

History and organisation 
Metrocentro is owned by Grupo Roble, which is based in San Salvador, El Salvador. The shopping mall Metrocentro in San Salvador is the largest shopping center in Central America. It was the first Metrocentro and opened in 1970.

There are Metrocentros in:

Santa Ana, El Salvador
San Miguel, El Salvador
San Salvador, El Salvador
Sonsonate, El Salvador
Managua, Nicaragua
Villa Nueva, Guatemala

References

External links
Grupo Roble website

Retailing in Guatemala
Retailing in Nicaragua